Hacımehmetli can refer to:

 Hacımehmetli, Alanya
 Hacımehmetli, Baskil